Giorgio Zampori (4 June 1887 – 7 December 1965) was an Italian gymnast who competed in the Summer Olympic Games in 1912, 1920 and 1924.

Biography
He was part of the Italian team that won three consecutive gold medal in the gymnastics men's team event. He also won the gold medal in the Individual all-round in 1920.

Achievements

See also
 Legends of Italian sport - Walk of Fame
 Italian men gold medalist at the Olympics and World Championships

References

External links
 

1887 births
1965 deaths
Italian male artistic gymnasts
Gymnasts at the 1912 Summer Olympics
Gymnasts at the 1920 Summer Olympics
Gymnasts at the 1924 Summer Olympics
Olympic gymnasts of Italy
Olympic gold medalists for Italy
Olympic bronze medalists for Italy
Olympic medalists in gymnastics
Medalists at the 1912 Summer Olympics
Medalists at the 1920 Summer Olympics
Medalists at the 1924 Summer Olympics
Gymnasts from Milan